Tom Kalkhuis (born 15 May 1986 in Amsterdam) is a Dutch football player who currently plays for FC Breukelen and previously played for FC Omniworld and Onisilos Sotira.

External links
 Player profile 

1986 births
Living people
Dutch footballers
Dutch expatriate footballers
Association football forwards
Footballers from Amsterdam
Expatriate footballers in Cyprus
Eerste Divisie players
Almere City FC players
Haaglandia players
Onisilos Sotira players
Cypriot Second Division players